was a Japanese diplomat who served as Minister of Foreign Affairs three times during and after World War II and as Deputy Prime Minister. As a civilian plenipotentiary representing the Japanese government, Shigemitsu cosigned the Japanese Instrument of Surrender on board the battleship  on September 2, 1945.

Early life and career
Shigemitsu was born in what is now part of the city of Bungo-ōno, Ōita Prefecture, Japan. He graduated from the Law School of Tokyo Imperial University in 1911 and immediately entered the Ministry of Foreign Affairs. After World War I, he served in numerous overseas diplomatic assignments, including in Germany and the United Kingdom and briefly as consul at the Japanese consulate in Seattle, Washington, United States.

Pre-war
Following the Mukden Incident in 1931, Shigemitsu was active in various European capitals, attempting to reduce alarm at Japanese military activities in Manchuria.

During the First Shanghai Incident of 1932, he was successful in enlisting the aid of western nations in brokering a ceasefire between the Kuomintang Army and the Imperial Japanese Army. On April 29, 1932, while attending a celebration for the birthday of Emperor Hirohito in Shanghai, a Korean independence activist, Yoon Bong-Gil threw a bomb at a reviewing stand killing General Yoshinori Shirakawa and wounding several others, including Shigemitsu. Shigemitsu lost his right leg in the attack and walked with an artificial leg and cane for the rest of his life.

Shigemitsu later became ambassador to the Soviet Union, and in 1938, he negotiated a settlement of the Russo-Japanese border clash at Changkufeng Hill. He then became Japan's ambassador to the United Kingdom during a period of deteriorating Anglo-Japanese relations, most notably the Tientsin incident of 1939, which pushed Japan to the brink of war with the United Kingdom. He was recalled in June 1941.

World War II
Shigemitsu was highly critical of the foreign policies of Yōsuke Matsuoka, especially the Tripartite Pact, which he warned would further strengthen anti-Japanese sentiment in the United States. Shigemitsu spent two weeks in Washington, DC, on the way back from Britain and conferred with Ambassador Kichisaburō Nomura to attempt to arrange for direct face-to-face negotiations between Japanese Prime Minister Fumimaro Konoe and US President Franklin D. Roosevelt.

Shigemitsu's many attempts to stave off World War II angered the militarists in Tokyo, and only two days after the attack on Pearl Harbor, he was sidelined with an appointment as ambassador to the Japanese-sponsored Reorganized National Government of China. In China, Shigemitsu argued that the success of the proposed Greater East Asia Co-Prosperity Sphere depended on the equal treatment of China and the other Asian nations by Japan.

On April 20, 1943, in a move that was viewed as a sign that Japan might be preparing for a collapse of the Axis Powers, Japanese Prime Minister Hideki Tōjō replaced Foreign Minister Masayuki Tani with Shigemitsu, who had been steadfast in his opposition to the militarists. Shigemitsu was thus foreign minister during the Greater East Asia Conference. The American press often referred to him in headlines as "Shiggy".

From July 22, 1944 to April 7, 1945, he served simultaneously as Minister of Foreign Affairs and Minister of Greater East Asia in the Kuniaki Koiso administration. He then again served as Minister of Foreign Affairs briefly in August 1945 in the Prince Higashikuni Naruhiko administration right before Japan's surrender.

Shigemitsu, as civilian plenipotentiary, along with General Yoshijirō Umezu, signed the Japanese Instrument of Surrender on board the battleship  on September 2, 1945.

Post-war
Despite Shigemitsu's well-known opposition to the war, at the insistence of the Soviet Union, he was taken into custody by the Supreme Commander of the Allied Powers and held in Sugamo Prison as an accused war criminal. Despite a signed deposition by Joseph Grew, the former ambassador of the United States to Japan, over the protests of Joseph B. Keenan, the chief prosecutor, Shigemitsu had his case came to trial and was convicted by the International Military Tribunal for the Far East for waging an aggressive war and for not doing enough to protect prisoners-of-war from inhumane treatment. However, the tribunal was extremely lenient on the grounds that Shigemitsu had regularly opposed Japanese militarism and protested the POWs' inhumane treatment.

He was sentenced to seven years in prison, the lightest punishment that was handed down to anyone convicted at the trial. He was paroled in 1950.

After the end of the occupation of Japan, Shigemitsu formed a short-lived political party, Kaishintō, which merged with the Japan Democratic Party in 1954. In October 1952, he was elected to a seat in the Lower House of the Diet of Japan, and in 1954, he became Deputy Prime Minister of Japan under Prime Minister Ichirō Hatoyama, the leader of Japan Democratic Party.

The cabinet continued after the merger of the party and the Liberal Party as the Liberal Democratic Party (LDP) in 1955, and Shigemitsu continued to hold the post of Deputy Prime Minister of Japan until 1956.

Shigemitsu concurrently served as Foreign minister from 1954 to 1956. In April 1955, he represented Japan at the Bandung Conference held in Indonesia, which marked the beginning of the return of Japan to participating in an international conference since the League of Nations. Then in August, Shigemitsu led a high-level Japanese delegation to the United States to press for a revision to the U.S.-Japan Security Treaty, but this effort was met with a cold reception from Secretary of State John Foster Dulles, who had been the treaty's primary architect and was loath to revisit it. Dulles told Shigemitsu in no uncertain terms that any discussion of treaty revision was "premature" because Japan lacked "the unity, cohesion, and capacity to operate under a new treaty arrangement," and Shigemitsu was forced to return to Japan empty-handed.

The following year, Shigemitsu addressed the United Nations General Assembly, pledging Japan's support of the founding principles of the United Nations and formally applying for membership. Japan became the UN's 80th member on December 18, 1956. Shigemitsu also travelled to Moscow in 1956 in an attempt to normalize diplomatic relations and to resolve the Kuril Islands dispute. The visit resulted in the Soviet–Japanese Joint Declaration of 1956.

Death
In January 1957, a year after his visit to the Soviet Union, Shigemitsu died of myocardial infarction at 69 in his summer home in Yugawara, Kanagawa.

References

Sources
  
 Archive Footage references to Shigemitsu at Internet Movie Database 
 Website on exhibition in Japanese Parliament Nov 8–30, 2007 , accessed November 14, 2007

External links
 

1887 births
1957 deaths
World War II political leaders
Japanese people of World War II
University of Tokyo alumni
Ambassadors of Japan to the Soviet Union
Ambassadors of Japan to the United Kingdom
Ambassadors of Japan to China
Deputy Prime Ministers of Japan
Foreign ministers of Japan
Japanese amputees
Japanese politicians with disabilities
Japanese people convicted of war crimes
People convicted by the International Military Tribunal for the Far East
Permanent Representatives of Japan to the United Nations
Members of the House of Representatives (Japan)
Democratic Party (Japan, 1954) politicians
Liberal Democratic Party (Japan) politicians
Japanese politicians convicted of crimes
Politicians from Ōita Prefecture
Consuls General of Japan in Shanghai